Ruieni Hydro Power Plant is a large power plant on the Sebeş River situated in Romania.

The project was started and finished in the 1990s and it was made up by the construction of a rockfill with a clay core dam 125 m high which was equipped with two vertical turbines, the hydropower plant having an installed capacity of 153 MW.

The power plant generated 264 GWh of electricity.

See also

Porţile de Fier I
Porţile de Fier II

References

Hydroelectric power stations in Romania
Dams in Romania